Patrick Bell is a Canadian former politician. He was born in Vancouver.

He was British Columbia's Minister of Jobs, Tourism and Skills Training and Minister Responsible for Labour.  He was the British Columbia Liberal Party MLA for the riding of Prince George Northfor two terms. Bell also served as member of the Cabinet Priorities and Planning Committee.

He was first elected to the Legislative Assembly of British Columbia in the 2001 British Columbia general election and was re-elected in 2005. Bell was previously the Minister of State for Mining and Minister of Agriculture and Lands. In 2011, he was made the inaugural Minister of Jobs, Tourism and Innovation.

Bell was a small business owner who has owned a trucking company and co-owned a logging company. He owns two Wendy's Restaurants in Prince George.

On February 17, 2013 Bell announced that due to health problems (an aneurysm), he would not stand for re-election in May.

In 2015 he and his son Doug opened a fruit winery called Northern Lights Estate Winery in Prince George.

See also
Executive Council of British Columbia

References

External links
Pat Bell, MLA (copy archived July 19, 2011)
Northern Lights Estate Winery

Year of birth missing (living people)
Living people
British Columbia Liberal Party MLAs
People from Prince George, British Columbia
Politicians from Vancouver
Members of the Executive Council of British Columbia
21st-century Canadian politicians